The 2017 BinckBank Tour was a road cycling stage race that took place between 7 and 13 August in the Netherlands and Belgium. It was a continuation of the Eneco Tour but was renamed following a change in title sponsor. As such, it was the 13th edition, the first one under the name BinckBank Tour. It was also the 29th event of the 2017 UCI World Tour. It was won by Tom Dumoulin.

Teams 

All UCI WorldTeam were invited as the race is part of the UCI World Tour. The race organisation also gave out wildcards to four UCI Professional Continental teams.

Schedule 

The course for the race was announced in May 2017.

Stages

Stage 1

7 August 2017 – Breda to Venray,

Stage 2

8 August 2017 – Voorburg, individual time trial (ITT)

Stage 3

9 August 2017 – Blankenberge to Ardooie,

Stage 4

10 August 2017 – Lanaken to Lanaken,

Stage 5

11 August 2017 – Sittard-Geleen to Sittard-Geleen,

Stage 6

12 August 2017 – Riemst to Houffalize,

Stage 7

13 August 2017 – Essen to Geraardsbergen,

Classification leadership table 

There are four principal classifications in the race. The first of these is the general classification, calculated by adding up the time each rider took to ride each stage. Time bonuses are applied for winning stages (10, 6 and 4 seconds to the first three riders) and for the three "golden kilometre" sprints on each stage. At each of these sprints, the first three riders are given 3-, 2- and 1-second bonuses respectively. The rider with the lowest cumulative time is the winner of the general classification. The rider leading the classification wins a green jersey.

There is also a points classification. On each road stage the riders are awarded points for finishing in the top 10 places, with other points awarded for intermediate sprints. The rider with the most accumulated points is the leader of the classification and wins the blue jersey. The combativity classification is based solely on points won at the intermediate sprints; the leading rider wins the black jersey. The final classification is a team classification: on each stage the times of the best three riders on each team are added up. The team with the lowest cumulative time over the seven stages wins the team classification.

References

External links
 

Benelux Tour
BinckBank Tour
BinckBank Tour
BinckBank Tour
BinckBank Tour